The Political Reform Act (Act 1/1977, of 4 January, for the Political Reform) was the Spanish law that allowed the elimination of the structures of the Franco dictatorship from a legal point of view. It was adopted on 18 November 1976, by the Spanish Parliament with the support of 435 out of 531 members (81% in favor) that formed the legislature, and submitted to a referendum with a participation of the 77,8% of the census and with 94,17% of the votes in favor. It had the status of Fundamental Law, being the last one of the Fundamental Laws of the Francoist State. The Spanish Constitution, which was signed by King Juan Carlos on 27 December 1978, repealed the Act on 29 December 1978, the day that the Constitution came into force.

Background 
Seven political associations, constituted thanks to the Political Associations Act of 1976 which was enacted during the government of Arias Navarro to support in democracy to the so-called sociological Francoism, founded on 9 October 1976, a new political party, Alianza Popular (AP). Their leaders were Manuel Fraga, Licinio de la Fuente, Federico Silva, Laureano López Rodó, Gonzalo Fernández de la Mora, Enrique Thomas de Carranza  and Cruz Martínez Esteruelas. Both Adolfo Suárez and Torcuato Fernández-Miranda were prepared to dissolve the Cortes Generales in the event of opposition, since his term had been fulfilled.

After the bill was approved by the Council of Ministers, it was submitted to the National Council of the Movement and it was approved on 16 October by 80 votes in favor, 13 against and 6 abstentions. This body prolonged its own dissolution:

Content 
The Political Reform Act was the legal instrument that allowed the Spanish Transition to be carried out within the dictatorial system established by General Francisco Franco. This law established a parliamentary monarchy under Juan Carlos I, and eventually led to a referendum to approve the Constitution of 1978.

The act is divided in five primary articles, three transitory articles (which regulate some legal situations in a provisional way) and a final disposition.

 The first two primary articles regulate the form of the state (democracy, popular sovereignty, fundamental rights...), the legislative power, universal suffrage and the role of the King.
 The third and the fourth primary articles regulates the way that the constitutional reforms projects are handled between the Congress and the Senate.
 The fifth primary article regulates the referendums.
 The first transitory article regulates the way how the elections are going to work, with the number of deputies and senators, the people that can vote and electoral districts.
 The second and the third transitory articles regulate the moments after the elections, including how both legislative chambers are going to be organized, and the rules that will govern both chambers until the approval of new ones.

The final disposition clarifies that the act will have the level of a fundamental law.

Parliamentary process 
Since the first moment, prime minister Adolfo Suárez wanted to approve the act legally. His party defended the approval of the act in the Spanish legislature. The debate about the act started on 16 November and ended on 18 November.

The first member of parliament (procurador) to defend the act was Miguel Primo de Rivera and Urquijo along with Fernando Suárez González, the first representative of the lecture. The next day, 17 November, was the turn of the MPs, who gave arguments in favour and against. The last day, 18 November, was the responses of the impellers.

One of the most difficult moments was the intervention of Blas Piñar López against the act:

Voting 
The act was voted at 09:35 PM of 18 November 1976. It had 425 votes in favour, 59 against, and 13 abstentions. This voting and the consequent approval is known as the «harakiri of the Francoist Cortes».

The final words of the official approval of the Act were:

Referendum 

This Act, after the approval of the Spanish Courts, was submitted to referendum on 18 December 1976. The participation was 77,8% of the census and with a 94,17% votes in favor.

Consequences 
The approval of this law is seen as the political transformation of the country, turning Spain into a democracy, with a parliamentary monarchy and with the rule of law as one of the fundamental principles of the State.

This law also gives sovereignty to the people and a variety of rights, which would later be developed by the Constitution of 1978. Another principle that this law established is the separation of powers, all of which were previously concentrated in the person of the dictator and are now divided between the government (executive power), the courts (judicial power) and the parliament or Cortes Generales (legislative power).

Six months after this law was approved, Spain celebrated in 1977 its first democratic elections since 1936.

References

See also 
 Spanish transition to democracy
 Spanish Constitution of 1978
 Politics of Spain

Politics of Spain
Law of Spain
1977 in Spain
1977 in law
Reform in Spain
Spanish transition to democracy
Legal history of Spain